Ervenik is a village and municipality in Šibenik-Knin County, Croatia. There were 1,105 inhabitants in 2011, and 97.19% of the population are Serbs, making Ervenik the municipality with the highest percentage of Serbs in Croatia.

Villages
The municipality of Ervenik includes 5 villages:

 Ervenik
 Mokro Polje
 Oton
 Pađene
 Radučić

Ervenik Municipality 

Note: Formed from part of the pre-war municipality of Knin.

Ervenik (village) 

Note: From 1857 until 1961 the village of Ervenik was listed as two separate inhabited places, Donji Ervenik and Gornji Ervenik. The population from those years is the sum of the two villages.

References 

Municipalities of Croatia
Populated places in Šibenik-Knin County